Hägen is a village and a former municipality in the district of Dithmarschen, in Schleswig-Holstein, Germany. Since 1 January 2009, it is part of the municipality Süderheistedt.

Villages in Schleswig-Holstein
Former municipalities in Schleswig-Holstein